Creekmore is a surname. Notable people with the surname include:

Frederick H. Creekmore (born 1937), politician and former Democratic member of the Virginia House of Delegates
Hubert Creekmore, (1907–1966), American poet and author from the small Mississippi town, Water Valley
Nate Creekmore (born 1982), American cartoonist
Raymond Creekmore (1905–1984), prolific artist, author and sailboat designer

See also
Creekmoor
Cregmore (disambiguation)